Agnos is a commune in the Pyrénées-Atlantiques department in the Nouvelle-Aquitaine region in southwestern France. Agnos is part of the urban area (unité urbaine) of Oloron-Sainte-Marie.

The inhabitants of the commune are known as Agnosiens or Agnosiennes

Geography
Agnos is located just 2 km south of Oloron-Sainte-Marie and some 25 km southwest of Pau. It can be accessed on the D155 road from Bidos in the northeast coming southwest to the village then continuing southeast to Gurmençon. The D555 road also passes through the commune from the north and joins the D155 northeast of the village. The commune is mixed farmland and forests with the forests scattered throughout the commune.

The river Mielle, a tributary of the Gave d'Oloron (Adour basin), flows through the commune.

Places and hamlets

 La Baig
 Candalot
 Dufau
 Fontaine Anglade
 Laborde-Boy
 Lasserre
 Ledorré
 Logecoop
 Mirande
 Le Plouts
 Sayette
 Sentin

Neighbouring communes and villages

Toponymy
The commune name in béarnais is Anhos. Michel Grosclaude suggested that Agnos came from a Latin man's name Annius with an Aqitaine suffix -ossum the whole meaning "domain of Annius".

The following table details the origins of the commune name and other names in the commune.

Sources:
Raymond: Topographic Dictionary of the Department of Basses-Pyrenees, 1863, on the page numbers indicated in the table. 
Grosclaude: Toponymic Dictionary of communes, Béarn, 2006 
Cassini: Cassini Map from 1750

Origins:
Fors de Béarn
Census: Census of Béarn
Reformation: Reformation of Béarn

History
Paul Raymond noted on page 3 of his 1863 dictionary that in 1385 Agnos had seventeen fires and depended on the bailiwick of Oloron.

The commune was merged with Gurmençon on 1 February 1973 to form the commune called Val-du-Gave d'Aspe. It was restored to its previous status on 1 January 1983.

Administration

List of Successive Mayors of Agnos

Inter-communality
The town is part of five inter-communal organisations:
the Community of communes of Haut Béarn
the SIVU to limit floods in Agnos
the AEP Union for Agnos-Gurmençon
the Inter-communal Union for Sanitisation for the Aspe gateway
the energy union for Pyrénées-Atlantiques

Population

Economy
The activity of the commune is mainly agricultural (farming, polyculture). The town is part of the Appellation d'origine contrôlée (AOC) of ossau-iraty.

Culture and heritage

Religious Heritage

The Church has a Trinitarian steeple (the presence of a Bell-gable or campenard). It contains many items which are registered as historical objects (although some were destroyed by fire in 1968):
An Altar (destroyed) (18th century)
6 Candlesticks (destroyed) (18th century)
A Cross (destroyed) (18th century)
A Tabernacle (destroyed) (18th century)
A Chalice (18th century)
A Ciborium (18th century)
A Retable (destroyed) (18th century)

Environmental heritage
The Forests of Bugangue and Labaigt are inter-association woods managed by the National Office of Forests (ONF) which provide valuable shelter for preserving local flora and fauna. Many species are protected. An arboretum is a result of collaboration with the ONF.

The Mielle, a small stream that rises in Agnos, is listed in the Natura 2000 program for three rare species: white-clawed crayfish, European pond turtles, and the rare European mink which does not exist anywhere in France except in the south-west.

The Pyrenees are rich in scenery and the village of Agnos is the starting point of one of the most attractive routes for cycling across the foothills: From Agnos to Mail Arrouil and back (four hours of cycling or seven hours of walking) in a variety of environments, moors, rocks, meadows with views of the Pyrenees. This route, like many others, is managed by the local hiking plan of the Community of communes of Piémont Oloronais (CCPO).

Facilities

Associations
The model aircraft club welcomes its members in the Sayette neighborhood.

Education
The town has a primary school.

Multi-Media Library
The Multi-media library project of the CCPO identified the municipal library of Agnos as a relay point.

Sports and sports equipment
The basketball club merged with that of Asasp in 2006 to form BCHB (Basketball Club of Haut-Bearn).

Notable People linked to the commune
Catherine Capdevielle, born in 1938 in Agnos, is an athlete specialising in ordeal sprinting.

See also
Communes of the Pyrénées-Atlantiques department

References

External links
Agnos Town Hall website 
Agnos official website 
Community of communes of Piémont oloronais website 
Agnos on the 1750 Cassini Map

Communes of Pyrénées-Atlantiques